Justice Lords are a fictional team of anti-heroes/anti-villains who first appeared in the two-part Justice League episode "A Better World", which was broadcast on November 1, 2003.

The Justice Lords were brought into DC Comics' canonical multiverse with The Multiversity Guidebook #1 by Grant Morrison in 2015. Their world is situated on Earth-50.

Television appearances
The Justice Lords are an alternate Justice League from a parallel Earth whose roster resembles the original DC Animated Universe Justice League—an alternate Batman, Green Lantern, Hawkgirl, Martian Manhunter, Superman, and Wonder Woman—with the exception of the Flash, who was killed by Lex Luthor.

Their world diverges from that of the world of the Justice League when Lex Luthor is elected President and establishes policies resulting in the prediction that a nuclear war between the League and the government could destroy the entire Earth. Batman, Superman, and Wonder Woman try to stop the war, storming the White House and confronting Luthor. When Luthor tells Superman no matter how many times he sends him to prison, he would find a way back to power, Superman kills Luthor with his heat vision, and decides he likes this new form of "justice". The others also lose faith in humanity.

For two years, the Justice Lords seize the world's governments and begin ruling with an iron fist. Using their satellite base for surveillance, they ban free speech, limit elections, and eliminate crime by lobotomizing criminals and supervillains through Lord Superman's heat vision, although they justify their behavior as "temporary" and for the people's own good. Lord Superman has also imposed severe restrictions on his girlfriend Lois Lane's way of life, forbidding her from making phone calls, having unauthorized guests, or leaving her home.

"A Better World"
The Justice Lords discover their counterparts when Lord Batman finds the League during an experiment which allowed him to view the alternate universe, as well as be transported there. Bored with their own world, the Lords decide to "assist" their counterparts by having their tyranny on the League's world, and trick them into going to the alternate Earth. When the League arrives, they are imprisoned and rendered unconscious. They are later transferred to cells designed to neutralize their powers, and Lord Batman stays behind to keep watch over them.

When the rest of the Lords arrive on mainstream Earth, they meet Doomsday, a monstrous fighter who challenges Earth's mightiest combatants and goes on a rampage. The Lords, especially Lord Superman, are happy to fight him. After a hard fight, Lord Superman lobotomizes Doomsday with his heat vision. Lois Lane is surprised by this, and knowing the real Superman, deduces that the Lords are not the League.

The League escapes from the holding facility when the Flash accelerates his heartbeat to make Lord Batman think that he has flatlined. Lord Batman opens the Flash's cell door, is quickly locked in the cell by the Flash and the League escapes. Most go to Arkham Asylum to retrieve Hawkgirl, although Batman goes to the Batcave to get the dimensional transporter. There Batman and Lord Batman fight, and Batman convinces Lord Batman that the Lords' methods are wrong, after sarcastically saying if his parents were alive, they would be proud of his actions. Lord Batman saves the League from the alternate Earth's security forces and sends them back to their reality.

On mainstream Earth, Superman approaches Lex Luthor for help against the Lords, who agrees in exchange for a presidential pardon, and so the League distracts the Lords to allow Luthor to use a power disruptor to permanently strip them of their powers. The Lords are sent back to their Earth, and Luthor expresses his intention to enter politics.

Long-term effects
The Lords' proposed alterations of mainstream Earth have repercussions in the first two seasons of Justice League Unlimited. The events of "A Better World" aid Amanda Waller's crusade against the destructive capabilities of the metahuman population if the government left it unchecked. When Waller is confronted by Batman, she reveals simulations that show what would happen if the League went rogue; each time, the government was defeated. Project Cadmus, established to counter Superman if he went rogue (as shown in the Superman: The Animated Series two-part episode "Legacy"), then called "Project: Achilles", expanded its threat list to the entire Justice League. Mistrust increased within the League; Batman and the Question fear that what happened to the Lords' Earth would happen to theirs when Luthor nearly wins the presidency, and the Question tries to kill Luthor.

The League's apparent degeneration cast it into an increasingly bad light. However, it successfully recruits the populist, astute Green Arrow as its political conscience; he puts the role of Cadmus in perspective for the League, preventing it from succumbing to the temptation that created the Lords.

Luthor hacks the Justice League Watchtower to attack Cadmus headquarters, causing extensive collateral damage to the surrounding area. The public turns against the League, and they decide to decommission the Watchtower and faithfully surrender (except for Batman, who wants to clear the League's name on his own). However, Cadmus decides to retaliate, sending Galatea (a clone of Supergirl) and an army of genetically engineered metahumans to destroy the Watchtower and kill the rest of the League on board. The League subdues the clones and Supergirl defeats Galatea. When Batman finally convinces Waller that Luthor is responsible for the attack, they confront him in his Lexcorp offices, only to be beaten back by Lex, who demonstrates unnatural speed and strength due to Brainiac secretly being in his body for several years.

"Divided We Fall" 
In "Divided We Fall", Brainiac and Luthor unite into an entity that creates duplicate androids of the Lords to fight the League, playing on their worst fears: Superman becoming a Justice Lord, and Green Lantern and Hawkgirl's failed relationship and her pariah status on Earth and Thanagar. Only Flash appeared to be the most unaffected by his replica's taunts due to his optimistic nature, and the androids were quickly destroyed, though the group of androids was merely a delaying tactic on the part of the Brainiac/Luthor entity.

The growing fear that the League might become the Lords reaches a climax in this episode, when the Flash exceeds his maximum speed to destroy Brainiac, vanishing into the Speed Force. With Flash supposedly dead and Luthor at his mercy, Superman is put in the same position as his Justice Lord counterpart, but resists the temptation and proclaims that he is his own person. J'onn then senses Flash's presence, and the League successfully pulls him back to reality.

Realizing they have estranged themselves from those they are trying to protect and still fearful of the future, Superman publicly announces the complete dissolution of the Justice League. However, Green Arrow challenges him, saying the Justice League was bigger than any individual and would continue without the original seven, and Superman changes his mind, deciding for the League to establish an embassy on Earth as a secondary Watchtower and maintain a closer relationship with governments and law enforcement.

Members
 Superman (voiced by George Newbern) - Leader of the Justice Lords, who breaks into the White House and kills President Luthor after Luthor kills Flash. He and the other Lords then impose their version of justice on the world. Superman lobotomizes the villains (including The Joker, Poison Ivy, Two-Face, Doomsday and Ventriloquist), despite opposition from Lois Lane. He and the other Lords capture the Justice League and plan to take over their Earth. Responding to Lex Luthor's escape from prison, he leads the others into a trap in which Luthor is the Justice League's Martian Manhunter. Superman defeats Flash, and is willing to kill him when Luthor blasts him with an energy disruptor.
 Batman (voiced by Kevin Conroy) - Unlike the others, Batman is morally ambiguous; while he does not join in their escapades, he is unperturbed by them. Batman discovers the Justice League, captures them with the other Lords and takes over their world. When Batman remains behind to guard the League, the Flash accelerated his heart rate until he seemed to flatline. Although Batman is alerted, the Flash overpowers him and locks him up. He escapes and battles League Batman in the Batcave; though he initially convinces League Batman to side with him, witnessing a man being arrested for simply complaining about a restaurant bill makes him realize that the League's cause is just. League Batman convinces him to help the League return to their world.
 Wonder Woman (voiced by Susan Eisenberg) - Helps Superman defeat and lobotomize Doomsday. She is defeated by her counterpart when Luthor blasts her with an energy disruptor.
 J'onn J'onzz (voiced by Carl Lumbly) - When the Lords discover the Justice League, he leads them into a trap and helps in the fight against Doomsday. He is defeated by his League counterpart (Martian Manhunter), aided by Luthor and his energy disruptor.
 Green Lantern (voiced by Phil LaMarr) - Unlike his League counterpart, he maintains his relationship with Hawkgirl.
 Hawkgirl (voiced by Maria Canals-Barrera) - She maintains her relationship with John Stewart.
 The Flash - When Luthor becomes president, he sends the army after the Flash and kills him.

Merchandise
The Justice Lords were released in the Justice League Unlimited toy line in three 3-pack collector sets. The first set featured Superman, Batman, and Wonder Woman. A reviewer wrote that although they do not stand up on their own, they "represent one of the most popular episodes of the entire Justice League series". The next pack contained Martian Manhunter, Green Lantern and the Flash. The final set contained Hawkgirl and the Brainiac versions of Superman and Batman. In 2012 Treehouse Kids released its Heroics line of collectable figurines, which includes Justice Lords Superman as a chase figure.

Inspiration and parallels
According to the DVD commentary on the second part of "A Better World", although the Justice Lords began as a Crime Syndicate of America story, the writers decided that a story about a rogue Justice League had more story potential as the Crime Syndicate was simply evil. The episode is similar to a Dan Jurgens Justice League America story, "Destiny's Hand". In that story, the Atom dreams about the original Justice League becoming oppressive rulers of the world. Doctor Destiny tries to make this "dream universe" absorb the mainstream reality, and the modern Justice League fights the "evil" old Justice League.

In the DC Animated Universe itself, the Superman: The Animated Series episode "Brave New Metropolis" depicted an alternate Superman becoming a dictator after Lois Lane's death. The episode was also written by Stan Berkowitz.

The alternate universe presented in Injustice: Gods Among Us also shared much similarity to the Justice Lords, in that a parallel version of the Justice League, save for Batman, became oppressive rulers of the world after Superman was tricked by the Joker into killing Lois Lane, their unborn child, and destroying Metropolis with a nuclear bomb, for which Superman kills the Joker in retaliation, leading to his descent to tyranny. The alternative Batman, who had formed an underground Resistance movement to combat Superman's methods, brings in the mainstream version of the Justice League to combat Superman and his forces. Notable differences from the Justice Lords include Flash (who, in this continuity, is Barry Allen) being alive and fighting on Superman's side (before he realises how far the "heroes" have fallen and defects), Martian Manhunter was killed during the prequel comics fighting for Batman and Green Lantern Hal Jordan now a member of the Sinestro Corps as he fights for Superman, while John Stewart is killed along with most of the Corps.

The premise of a Justice League-type super-team establishing a totalitarian state for what they see as the good of humanity was explored in Marvel Comics' original Squadron Supreme miniseries, its recent reworking of that story, in Wild storm's The Authority and the "Titans Tomorrow" storyline of the Teen Titans comic book. The idea of metahumans taking control of humans, and of Superman leading them to make a better world, is also developed in the Elseworlds mini-series Kingdom Come. According to Bruce Timm's DVD commentary, Batman was to form the Outsiders as a counter-superteam of the Lords but the idea was discarded. In the Avengers Annual #2, the Avengers are sent to an alternate world by an early version of Kang; the original Avengers take over the world and imprison other super-beings, allegedly for their own good. The idea of altering criminals to prevent them from returning to crime was also part of the DC Comics mini-series Identity Crisis (albeit using magic and primarily intended to protect the heroes' secret identities) and in Marvel Comics' original Squadron Supreme miniseries.

See also
 Titans Tomorrow

References

External links

 World's Finest Online biopage
 Justice Lords at DCAU Wiki

DC Comics supervillain teams
Fictional dictators
Characters created by Bruce Timm
DC Animated Universe original characters
Fictional characters from parallel universes